Glynis is an American sitcom that aired Wednesdays at 8:30 pm on CBS from September 25 to December 18, 1963.

Synopsis
The series stars Welsh actress Glynis Johns as Glynis Granville, a mystery writer. Keith Andes appeared as Keith Granville, Glynis' husband who works as a successful criminal defense attorney. Together, the couple would attempt to solve various crimes. George Mathews co-stars as Glynis' friend, Chick Rogers, a retired police officer, who offers advice and solace in her writing.

Glynis faced competition from the third segment of the 90-minute western The Virginian on NBC and from Bill Cullen's The Price Is Right prime time game show on ABC.  The series was canceled after 13 episodes.

In 1965, when CBS brought the series back in reruns as a summer replacement for The Lucy Show, Glynis ranked #6 in the Nielsen ratings.

Background
On August 5, 1963, CBS' Vacation Playhouse aired an episode titled "Hide and Seek," which was the pilot for Glynis. The series' working title was The Glynis Johns Show, but eventually it was shortened to the star's first name.

Production notes
Glynis was produced by Desilu and created and executive produced by Jess Oppenheimer, who originated I Love Lucy with Lucille Ball and Desi Arnaz.

Notable guest stars
 John Dehner
 Eddie Foy Jr.
 Ned Glass
 Harvey Korman
 Strother Martin

Episodes

References

External links 
 

1963 American television series debuts
1963 American television series endings
1960s American sitcoms
Black-and-white American television shows
CBS original programming
American detective television series
English-language television shows
Television series by CBS Studios
Television series about marriage
Television shows about writers
Television series by Desilu Productions
Television shows set in California